Bonaigarh, also locally known as Bonai, is a subdivision of Sundergarh district of the Indian state of Odisha. It is 162 km east of the district headquarters in Sundargarh. It is a sub-divisional headquarter. The town is surrounded by the River Brahmani and the Khandadhar and Singardei Hills. Notable places of interest include a temple to the Lord Shiva (Baneswar Temple) and a Royal Palace.

The Bonaigarh subdivision is further divided into four tehsils or blocks. These include Bonaigarh, Koida, Lahunipara, and Gurundia.

Demographics 
The primary language spoken is Odia. Dialects spoken in the region include Sundargadi.

History and geography
During the British Raj, Bonaigarh was the capital of Bonai State. It was one of the princely states of the Chota Nagpur States belonging to the Eastern States Agency. 

Most searched 
Bonai Police Station = 9438916623
Baba Baneswar Temple Bonai = 7978357210 prist

Transport

Bonaigarh is situated besides Bhubaneswar-Rourkela National Highway which goes via Talcher, Pallahara and Barkote. From Barkote it is only 55 km. Though there is no train link to Bonaigarh, frequent buses are plying from Rourkela and Barkote. Once or twice in a day, buses are plying from Kuchinda, Keonjhar, Deogarh, Cuttack, and Bhubaneswar.

There is no railway station in Bonaigarh. However, Rourkela Railway Station is the major railway station at a distance of 65 kms.

Buses are well connected to Bonaigarh from various places. For example, Rourkela is connected by Sainath bus, Raahi Travels, Dildar Travels, Rakesh Travels, Tarini Travels and Sarala Travels. Deogarh, Barkote, Angul, Jharsuguda, Sambalpur and Sundergarh are connected by Sainath bus and Rakesh Coach (Rakesh Travels). Two private night buses namely "Krishna Jee", "A-ONE" and “Babamani” run to capital city Bhubaneswar via Dhenkanal and Cuttack.

Festivals
Bonaigarh is famous for an annual festival known as "Chaitra Mela", which starts during mid-April and continues up to mid-May every year. A goddess known as "Maa Basuli" is worshiped by the local folks for the relevant period along with many small temporary vending markets, circuses, rides, and Operas are found in the "Mela." Rath Yatra, Dussehra, Kantha Puja, Ramnavmi, Janmastami, Raja, Holi are the major festivals celebrated every year. During this time, Dussehra a goddess known as "Kanta Devi," is especially worshiped on the 9th day of the festival. Bonaigarh also has Muslim population who celebrate festivals such as Eid al-Fitr, Eid al-Adha & Muharram together with the people from other religion. A amall Christian population is also found who normally visit Bonaigarh Catholic Church and celebrate festivals like Christmas and Good Friday. Apart from various religious practices, customs and traditions. Secularism is prevailed widely which keeps the people united in Bonai region.

Education
In the education field, it is a growing town. Many doctors, engineers and lawyers, having reputed positions in different organisations of India and abroad are from this place. There are a number of schools and one college which is affiliated to Sambalpur University. But for higher education like Medical, Engineering, Law, Commerce, Business Administration etc. People are going out of town.

Agriculture and economy 
There are many crops like rice, corn etc., harvested during the year. Seasonal vegetables are also available throughout the year in a cheaper rate. One villages named Talita  famous for producing cauliflowers and cabbages during the winter. There are two weekly markets held on every Monday and Thursday where many local things including fruits, vegetables, groceries, utensils, pottery and plastics are traded between sellers and consumers.

It is also a good business center for the people here. There are 5 nationalized banks present here.
 STATE BANK OF INDIA, Bonai Branch  (IFSC code - SBIN0001343)
 PUNJAB NATIONAL BANK, Bonai Branch (IFSC code - PUNB0498600)
 PUNJAB NATIONAL BANK, Banki Branch (IFSC code - PUNB0244500) 
STATE BANK OF INDIA, Gurundia Branch (IFSC code - SBIN0005900)
 AXIS BANK, Near Church Chowk, Deogaon
 CANARA BANK, Main road, Near post office square
 ICICI BANK LTD., Main road, Near church square
 Sundargarh District Central Cooperative Bank Bonaigarh Branch (IFSC code - YESB0SNGB02)
 HDFC BANK LTD, Bonai branch
(IFSC Code - HDFC0005678)

Medical facilities 
There is one government hospital named "Bonaigarh Sub-Divisional Hospital," situated in the jail road. People from all the nearby villages and blocks depend on this hospital. However, some private clinics and dispensaries also exist to treat the people.

Schools and colleges

References

Sundergarh district